In Silence may refer to:

In Silence (album), an album by Fra Lippo Lippi
In Silence (film), 2014 film directed by Zdeněk Jiráský
"In Silence" (song), a song by Luna Sea

See also
In the Silence, a 2013 album by Ásgeir